Emilio Díaz (born 18 April 1940) is a Spanish former swimmer. He competed in the men's 200 metre breaststroke at the 1960 Summer Olympics.

References

External links
 

1940 births
Living people
Olympic swimmers of Spain
Swimmers at the 1960 Summer Olympics
Sportspeople from Huelva
Spanish male breaststroke swimmers